Everton de Paula Vanoni (born 4 July 1981) is a Brazilian football manager. He is the current assistant manager of Aimoré.

References

External links
 

1981 births
Living people
Sportspeople from Porto Alegre
Brazilian football managers
Esporte Clube São José managers